Gbeľany is a village and municipality in Žilina District in the Žilina Region of northern Slovakia.

History
In historical records the village was first mentioned in 1362.

Geography
The municipality lies at an altitude of 375 metres and covers an area of 7.134 km². It has a population of about 1244 people.

Notable people
 Ján Franek, former boxer who represented Czechoslovakia and winner of the 1980 Summer Olympics bronze medal.

Genealogical resources

The records for genealogical research are available at the state archive "Statny Archiv in Bytca, Slovakia"

 Roman Catholic church records (births/marriages/deaths): 1686-1896 (parish B)

See also
 List of municipalities and towns in Slovakia

External links
https://web.archive.org/web/20080111223415/http://www.statistics.sk/mosmis/eng/run.html 
Surnames of living people in Gbelany

Villages and municipalities in Žilina District